Edward Kaale-Ewola Dery (born 6 March 1969) is a Ghanaian politician and member of the Seventh Parliament of the Fourth Republic of Ghana representing the Lambussie Constituency in the Upper West Region on the ticket of the National Democratic Congress.

Early life 
Dery was born on 6 March 1969. He hails from Kpare in the Upper West region of Ghana.

Education 
Dery earned a diploma from University of Professional Studies. He also graduated as a Certified Information Systems Auditor in 2012 in the US.

Personal life 
Dery is a Christian. He is separated with three children.

Employment 
 Audit Manager, Joseph Odame and Partners Consult Limited, Accra
 Member of Parliament (January 7, 2013–present; 2nd term)

References

Ghanaian MPs 2017–2021
1969 births
Living people
National Democratic Congress (Ghana) politicians
University of Professional Studies alumni